306 may refer to:

 306 (number)
 306 AD, a year
 306 BC, a year
 Area code 306, area code for Saskatchewan

Media

Art
 306 Group, a New York City group of African-American artists

Film
 306 Hollywood

Literacy
 Lectionary 306, a Greek manuscript
 Minuscule 306, a Greek manuscript

Military

Military units

Germany
 Bau-Bataillon 306
 Police Battalion 306

Poland
 No. 306 Polish Fighter Squadron

United States
 VFP-306

Military vehicles
 USNS Benavidez (T-AKR 306), a Bob Hope-class vehicle cargo ship
 USS Bernalillo County (LST-306), an LST-1-class tank landing ship
 USS Specter (AM-306), an Admirable-class minesweeper
 USS Tang (SS-306), a Balao-class submarine

Science and technology

Astronomy
 306 Unitas, an asteroid
 NGC 306, an open cluster in Tucana

Technology
 HTTP 306

Transportation

Airplanes
 Boeing Model 306, a cancelled airplane

Automobiles
 Peugeot 306, a French compact car lineup
 Weiwang 306, a Chinese microvan

Boats
 Hunter 306, an American sailboat

Buses
 Fiat 306, an Italian bus

Roads and routes
 List of highways numbered 306
 Swissair Flight 306, a planned flight from Zürich to Rome

Trains
 British Rail Class 306